Run Antony is a 2016 Indian Kannada action thriller film written and directed by Raghu Shastri, making his debut. Produced by Parvathamma Rajkumar, Raghavendra Rajkumar and Guru Rajkumar under Vajreshwari Hospitality banner, the film stars Vinay Rajkumar and debutants Sushmita Joshi and Rukshar Dhillon in the lead roles. The film's score and soundtrack is composed by Manikanth Kadri whilst the cinematography is by Manohar Joshi.

The filming has taken place from December 2015 and took a stretch of 60 days to complete. The film released on 8 July 2016.

Cast
 Vinay Rajkumar as Antony D'souza
 Rukhsar Dhillon as Yashu/Yashwini
 Sushmita Joshi as Kannika
 Devaraj as Nazeem Khan (Intelligence Officer)
 K. S. Sridhar
 Sai Kumar as Intelligence Journalist (Guest Appearance)
 H. G. Dattatreya
 Bullet Prakash

Production

Development
Raghu Shastri, a former assistant to Bollywood director Anurag Kashyap was approached by Raghavendra Rajkumar to direct the script which he had made ready. Actor Vinay found the script interesting and agreed to star in the film choosing this as his second venture after the success of his first film Siddhartha (2015). The script is said to have a blend of both romance and thriller concepts. Early reports suggested the film would launch in November 2015 which eventually got postponed to December 2015.

Casting
Soon after selecting Raghu Shastry to direct the film, producer Raghavendra Rajkumar along with his actor son Vinay Rajkumar went on to search for the two female leads by browsing through around 500 photographs. They finalized Rukhsar Mir and Sushmita Joshi to play the roles. While Rukhsar hails from Darjeeling and doing her studies in Bangalore, Sushmita also is from Northern India. Veteran actor Devaraj was roped in to play an important supporting role.

Soundtrack
Manikanth Kadri has composed the score and original soundtrack for the film. Actor Puneeth Rajkumar has recorded a song for the film.

Track listing

Reception
The Hindu said running with Antony was tiresome. The Deccan chronicle rated 2 stars to the movie and reviewed the movie as a frustrating experience

References

External links
 

2016 films
2010s romantic thriller films
2010s Kannada-language films
Indian romantic thriller films
2016 directorial debut films